Break Point is a novel written by Rosie Rushton. It was published by Piccadilly Press in 2002.

Plot summary 
Emily Driver is the best young tennis player in East Sussex. After she wins Under 18s East Sussex Tennis Championship, a lot of journalists want to make an interview with her. One of them is Hugo Fraser - a trainee from Evening Argus magazine. When he interviews her, Emily's mother, Ruth, comes to changing room and tells her that Felix Fordyce - the best tennis coach in Great Britain wants to see her. Emily gets a scholarship of Felix's Tennis Academy. In the evening, she goes to Viki's party with her friend, Charlie. Emily meets Hugo there. She tells him that she doesn't want to be a tennis star, but she also tells him that she doesn't want this conversation to appear in his magazine. Then they jump off the wall and Viki takes photo of it.

Tomorrow, Emily goes to her grandmother's place. When they talk, she tells her mother that she doesn't want to play tennis anymore, because she wants to pass A-levels, study at university and work for UNICEF. Emily's mother doesn't want her daughter to waste her chance, but Lally (that's how Emily calls her grandmother) tells her to end her education and tells a story, which happened, when she was 16.

Alice's father dies, while fighting with Germans. Her mother sells tickets in the Tube. She thinks that her daughter should work, either. Alice doesn't like mother's idea. Her friend, Violet, visits her and she tries to convince her of going for a dancing. It was hard to make it, but finally Alice agrees. They meet American soldiers there. One of them, Zack, falls in love with Alice at the first sight. She does the same. They dance and talk about life and war. They promise each other to write letters. Few months later, Alice's got a lot of letters from him, but she didn't tell her mother about her sweetheart yet, because she only talks about Stanley. Few months later, she meets Zack. Suddenly, Germans bomb London. Alice's mother die then, and she blames herself for mother's death. She now lives at Turnbulls' in Alf's room (he died on the war). Stanley comes home and he proposes Alice to marry him. She agrees, because Zack didn't write to her from 2 years.
 
And now Lally will, finally, marry Zack. She tells her daughter and granddaughter about her plans, but Ruth is angry with it. Emily thinks it's great, but she isn't very happy, when Alice tells her that she will live in Montana. Ruth tells her own story about her dreams of being a fashion designer.

Ruth is talented. She draws nice pictures. She goes to Thameside College of Art and Design to take a folder of this school to show it to her parents. Then they are going to go to Brighton. Although her parents didn't like the idea, she goes there with Susie and other friends. They go to the cafe. Later, the boys start to demonstrate on the beach. The girls realise that they bought amphetamine there. The police comes there and they arrest Suise, Ruth and the boys. The girls come back to London. Ruth's parents don't trust her anymore.

After Emily heard that story, she tells her mother that she's a liar. Now Ruth wants to have her own company and decorate rooms, but she is sad, because her mother and daughter didn't think include her in their plans. Lally explains her that she can use the money, she wanted to spend for Tennis Academy.

Emily talks to Hugo about his article. He tells her that the editor liked it and wanted to publish it. She doesn't believe him and he calls her an egoist.

Lally marries Zack and leaves to Montana. Ruth's making good money, but Emily is tired of writing essays from economy. Hugo comes to her place and he must come back to the college. He talks to Emily about the future and he promises her that he will never ever leave her.

Characters
Emily Driver - 16-year-old tennis player. She got a scholarship of Felix Fordyce's Tennis Academy, but she didn't accept it. She's Hugo Fraser's girlfriend.
Ruth Driver - Emily's mum. As a teenager, she wanted to be a fashion designer, but her parents told her to go to the university. She was a history teacher and she designs rooms. 
Alice "Lally" Turnbull - Emily's grandmother. She's going to marry her sweetheart, Zack, who was a soldier during World War II and he lost an arm then. She thinks that Emily should end her education as she wants, but she didn't let her daughter Ruth become a fashion designer.
Hugo Fraser - trainee from Evening Argus. He interviewed Emily and then they met at Viki's party. Hugo published his article about Emily and she was angry with it. Now he's her boyfriend. 
Zack - an American soldier. He's Lally's sweetheart and they're getting married.
Charlotte (Charlie) - Emily's best friend.
Viki - Emily's friend, who wants to work as a photographer.
Violet - Lally's friend.
Dorothy Turnbull - Stanley's mother.
Stanley Turnbull - Alice's husband and Ruth's father.
Susie - Ruth's friend.

2002 British novels
British young adult novels
Novels by Rosie Rushton
Novels set in Sussex
Tennis mass media